Nitro Circus Live (also known as Nitro Circus Live: World Tour in the final three seasons) is a reality television show. It follows Travis Pastrana and the Nitro Circus crew as they perform live on tour around the world.

Cast
Travis Pastrana
Title: "Pro action sports athlete"
Pastrana is the Ringleader of the Nitro Circus Crew, is a pro FMX rider, rallycar driver, and NASCAR driver, and is usually the first to attempt any stunt involving dirt bikes or BMX bikes.
Andy Bell
Title: "Washed-up motorcycle rider"
Former FMX rider. Bell holds a rivalry with Pastrana involving Big Wheel tricycles stemming from the first episode of the series.
Jolene Van Vugt
Title: "Pro motocross racer"
Canadian Female Motocross Champion. She joins Pastrana in many stunts involving dirt bikes. Van Vugt took on more of a cheerleading role in the second season after breaking her arm and can be seen wearing a pink cast throughout the season.
Jim DeChamp
Title: "Pro mountain biker"
Pro mountain bike downhill racer and freestyle rider. He has been friends with Pastrana since childhood. They collaborate on many stunts together on the show. Became the first person to land a front-flip on a motorbike to dirt, as seen in the 7th episode of the first season.
Erik Roner
Title: "Pro skier/base jumper"
Pro extreme skier and base jumper. Roner is usually the first to attempt any stunt involving snow. He died in 2015 caused by a skydiving accident.
Tommy Passemante
Title: "Construction Worker"
Known by his nickname "Street Bike Tommy", given for a failed stunt in which he attempted to jump his Suzuki GSX-R motorcycle into the foam pit but overshot, breaking both his legs. He functions as the comic relief member of the crew, and is commonly employed for stunts that are the most dangerous and require the least amount of talent, known as "zero skill stunts". Although some rumored that Tommy had passed in a failed base jumping accident, he indeed did not and hosted a show with the cast of impractical jokers called The Explosion Show.
Greg Powell
Title: "Travis' cousin"
Pastrana's Cousin. Going by the nickname "Special Greg", Powell is the all-around member of the team, and generally attempts any stunt on the show. He was the first person to land a "Special Flip" on a BMX bike. He was a wide receiver on the University of Maryland football team from 2003–06 and is currently an over-the-wall crewman for Pastrana in NASCAR.

Episodes

Season 1: (2012)
Season 1 premiered on MTV2 on March 27, 2012 with back-to-back episodes and ended on May 16, 2012. The first season covers the crew's first ever tour and it begins with dates Down Under.

Season 2: (2013)
Season 2 covers the first European tour. It premiered on MTV2 April 9, 2013 and ended on May 28, 2013.

Season 3: (2013–14)
Season 3 premiered November 27, 2013 with back-to-back episodes and ended on January 7, 2014 on MTV2 with back-to-back episodes. The first two episodes covers moments from the first two seasons. Except for "Pastranaland", Season 3's episodes cover the crew's Asia tour as well as a couple stops in New Zealand.

Season 4: (2014)
Season 4 premiered on October 8, 2014 with back-to-back episodes. The fourth season will cover the crew's first ever North American tour along in addition to several stops in Europe. The first episode debuted on the MTV2 app a week before the premiere aired.

References

External links
 
 Nitro Circus Official Store
 Nitro Circus Fan Site
 Official Nitro Circus UK Store
 MTV: Nitro Circus
 Nitro Circus at IMDb

2012 American television series debuts
2012 American television series endings
2010s American reality television series
MTV2 original programming
Sports entertainment
English-language television shows
Motorcycle television series
Television series by Dickhouse Productions
Freestyle motocross